"Not Friends" is a song by the South Korean girl group Loona. It was released as the second song from Ryan Jhun's "Maxis By Ryan Jhun" project. Kim Lip is credited as a songwriter on the song making her the first Loona member to co-write a song for the group. The song peaked at number seven on the US World Digital Songs becoming the group's eighth top ten hit and also appeared on the Gaon Download Chart. On October 27 three new versions of the song were released along with the song's instrumental.

Background
Jhun and Loona first announced the collaboration in August 2021, alongside several teaser images of the four members.
The first teaser poster released featured the four members in pink set image. 'Keep Music Alive' was sprawled in bold letters across the teaser with the lyrics for the song revealed at the bottom. The cover for the single with a pink and green gun with the group's name on it was released on August 30. A 'project spoiler' where the behind-the-scenes of the group members at the recording was shared by Jhun the next day. A teaser for the music video was released a day before the song's release.

"Not Friends" is the second installment of the "MAXIS By Ryan Jhun" project, a collaboration between Jhun, Big Ocean ENM and Kakao Entertainment which started in August with the single "Maniac" featuring NCT's Doyoung and Haechan.

Composition
"Not Friends" mixes and meshes aspects of pop, acoustic rock and hip hop. Lyrically, the song boldly expresses the wish to break down the barrier between friendship and romance.

Music video
In the action-packed music video, the Loona members go up against each other in a fight to the end. JinSoul and HeeJin silently hunt one another down with sniper rifles, while KimLip and Yves take down hordes of armed fighters in their attempts to face-off in hand-to-hand combat.

Track listing
Digital single
 "Not Friends" (Alawin remix) – 4:31
 "Not Friends" (Tido remix) – 3:31
 "Not Friends" (Orbit remix) – 3:28
 "Not Friends" (original mix) – 3:15 
 "Not Friends" (instrumental) – 3:15

Charts

Notes

Release history

References

2021 songs
Loona (group) songs
Songs written by Ryan S. Jhun